Idoia Villanueva Ruiz (born 1980) is a Spanish politician. A member of Podemos, she serves as Member of the European Parliament integrated within the European United Left–Nordic Green Left political group since 2019. She previously was a member of the Senate of Spain from 2015 to 2019.

Biography 
Born in Pamplona on 17 July 1980, she earned a degree in IT engineering from the University of the Basque Country (UPV); she later obtained a master's degree in Business Management at the Autonomous University of Madrid (UAM). She worked for ten years in the management and development of tech projects. She was proposed to the post of Senator by Podemos, and, thus, she was designated as member of the Upper House in September 2015 by the Parliament of Navarre. She served as Podemos spokesperson in the Committee on Foreign Affairs and the Committee for the European Union. She joined the Podemos' executive board (the "Coordination Council") in February 2017 replacing Ángela Ballester. In October 2018, she was announced as prospective party candidate for the 2019 European Parliament election in Spain, and she was ultimately included in the fourth place of the Unidas Podemos Cambiar Europa electoral list.

She was elected MEP. She joined the Committee on Foreign Affairs (AFET), as well as the Delegation for relations with the People's Republic of China (D-CN), the Delegation for Relations with India (D-IN) and the Delegation to the ACP–EU Joint Parliamentary Assembly (DACP), serving as Vice-Chair in the latter body.

References
Informational notes

Citations

1980 births
Living people
Members of the 10th Senate of Spain
Members of the 11th Senate of Spain
Members of the 12th Senate of Spain
Members of the 13th Senate of Spain
MEPs for Spain 2019–2024
21st-century women MEPs for Spain
Podemos (Spanish political party) MEPs
Podemos (Spanish political party) politicians